The Myrmosidae are a small family of wasps very similar to the Mutillidae. As in mutillids, females are flightless, and are kleptoparasites in the nests of fossorial bees and wasps.

Taxonomy
Recent classifications of Vespoidea sensu lato (beginning in 2008) concluded that the family Mutillidae contained one subfamily that was unrelated to the remainder, and this subfamily was removed to form a separate family Myrmosidae. Myrmosids can be readily distinguished from mutillids by the lack of abdominal "felt lines" in both sexes, and the retention of a distinct pronotum in females (pronotum fused to mesonotum in mutillids).

Genera
 Carinomyrmosa
 Erimyrmosa
 Krombeinella
 Kudakrumia
 Leiomyrmosa
 Myrmosa
 Myrmosina
 Myrmosula
 Nothomyrmosa
 Paramyrmosa
 Protomutilla
 Pseudomyrmosa

References

External links

Apocrita families